The Orlík Reservoir is the largest hydroelectric dam in the Czech Republic. It dams the Vltava River near the village of Solenice, which is near the town of Příbram. The structure is named after Orlík Castle, which is situated a few kilometers above the dam. The dam has four turbines with a nominal capacity of 91 MW each having a total capacity of 364 MW.

Sources

See also

List of dams and reservoirs in the Czech Republic
List of lakes in the Czech Republic

Dams in the Czech Republic
Hydroelectric power stations in the Czech Republic
Písek District
Příbram District
Buildings and structures in the Central Bohemian Region
Dams completed in 1961
Reservoirs in the Czech Republic
1961 establishments in Czechoslovakia
20th-century architecture in the Czech Republic